Mladen Lazarević (Serbian Cyrillic: Младен Лазаревић; born 16 January 1984) is a Serbian professional footballer who plays as a defender for FK Dinamo Pančevo.

Career
Lazarević made his senior debut with Zemun in 2003. He spent three seasons with the Gornjovarošani, before transferring to Partizan in June 2006.

Lazarević joined FK Dinamo Pančevo ahead of the 2019/20 season.

Notes

References

External links
 
 
 

Association football defenders
Belgian Pro League players
Expatriate footballers in Belgium
Expatriate footballers in Iran
Expatriate footballers in Kazakhstan
FC Ordabasy players
First League of Serbia and Montenegro players
FK Mačva Šabac players
FK Napredak Kruševac players
FK Novi Pazar players
FK Partizan players
FK Sloboda Užice players
FK Spartak Subotica players
FK Zemun players
Gostaresh Foulad F.C. players
K.S.V. Roeselare players
K.V. Kortrijk players
FK Dinamo Pančevo players
Sportspeople from Sremska Mitrovica
Serbia and Montenegro under-21 international footballers
Serbian expatriate footballers
Serbian expatriate sportspeople in Belgium
Serbian expatriate sportspeople in Iran
Serbian expatriate sportspeople in Kazakhstan
Serbian footballers
Serbian First League players
Serbian SuperLiga players
1984 births
Living people